The Winter Album is the fourth album by The Brilliant Green before their five-year hiatus from 2002 to 2007.

The album is noted as being different from their previous albums as they experimented with electronic and synth beats.

Track listing

Notes

External links
 Official Site

2002 albums
The Brilliant Green albums